Alisa Drei (born 28 February 1978) is a Finnish former competitive figure skater. She finished in the top ten at seven European Championships.

Life and career 
Drei began skating at the age of three in Moscow; she and her mother subsequently moved to Finland and received Finnish citizenship.

Drei began competing internationally for Finland in 1994. She resided in Riihimäki and her coach was her mother, Elena Drei-Koskinen.

Drei announced her retirement on December 14, 2007 due to knee problems. She has a degree in sport psychology from a sports academy in Saint Petersburg. In February 2008, she began coaching young skaters in Espoo.

Programs

Competitive highlights

References

External links 

 

Living people
1978 births
Finnish female single skaters
Figure skaters from Moscow
Finnish people of Russian descent
Figure skaters at the 1998 Winter Olympics
Olympic figure skaters of Finland
Soviet emigrants to Finland
Naturalized citizens of Finland